The 2016 United States presidential election in Nebraska was held on Tuesday, November 8, 2016, as part of the 2016 United States presidential election in which all 50 states plus the District of Columbia participated. Nebraska voters chose electors to represent them in the Electoral College via a popular, pitting the Republican Party's nominee, businessman Donald Trump, and running mate Indiana Governor Mike Pence against Democratic Party nominee, former Secretary of State Hillary Clinton, and her running mate Virginia Senator Tim Kaine. Nebraska has five electoral votes in the Electoral College, two from the state at large, and one each from the three congressional districts.

Trump carried the state with 58.7% of the vote, while Clinton received 33.7%. Trump subsequently became the first Republican to win the White House without carrying Douglas or Lancaster County since William Howard Taft in 1908.

Caucuses and Primaries

Democratic caucus

The 2016 Nebraska Democratic caucuses was held on March 15, 2016, as part of a series of primary elections to decide the 2016 Democratic nominee for president. Senator Bernie Sanders won a commanding victory in the Cornhusker State, winning rural areas along with big cities such as Omaha and Lincoln. This was the last Democratic primary in Nebraska held via the caucus method, the state party switched to a standard popular vote to decide the allocation of delegates in future elections including 2020. In 2016, the Nebraska caucuses occurred on the same dates as Kansas and Louisiana. The former being won handily by Sanders, while the latter was won in a landslide by the eventual nominee Hillary Clinton.

Republican primary

Twelve candidates appeared on the Republican presidential primary ballot:
Ben Carson (withdrawn)
Ted Cruz (withdrawn)
John Kasich (withdrawn)
Marco Rubio (withdrawn)
Donald Trump

Libertarian primary

The Nebraska primary was held on May 10, 2016. Independents and registered Libertarians were allowed to vote in the state's Libertarian primary. The Nebraska Primary marked the third large victory for Gary Johnson in the handful of states that conduct Libertarian presidential primaries. However, since the Libertarian Party does not use such primaries for selecting delegates to its national nominating convention, the results were effectively non-binding.

General election

Polling
Nebraska's 1st Congressional District

Nebraska's 2nd Congressional District

Nebraska's 3rd Congressional District

Predictions
The following are final 2016 predictions from various organizations for Nebraska as of Election Day.

Results

Results by county
Final results by county from the Nebraska Secretary Of State.

Counties that flipped from Democratic to Republican
Thurston (largest village: Pender)

Counties that flipped from Republican to Democratic
Douglas (largest city: Omaha)
Lancaster (largest city: Lincoln)

By congressional district
Trump won all of the state's three congressional districts, winning all of the state's electoral votes.

See also
 United States presidential elections in Nebraska
 Presidency of Donald Trump
 2016 Democratic Party presidential debates and forums
 2016 Democratic Party presidential primaries
 2016 Republican Party presidential debates and forums
 2016 Republican Party presidential primaries

References

External links
 RNC 2016 Republican Nominating Process 
 Green papers for 2016 primaries, caucuses, and conventions

NE
2016
Presidential